Not Like Other Girls is the debut album by S.O.A.P. It was released on 18 March 1998 in Denmark and on 5 May in the U.S., as a self-titled album on Crave Records, with a European release under Sony held around the same time. Remee wrote the lyrics for the album, which was produced by Holger Lagerfeldt. The album was certified gold in Finland and Denmark, and had sold over 15,000 copies in the US by July 1998. By August 2000, it had sold 1.5 million copies worldwide. The album's debut single was "This Is How We Party". The second single was "Ladidi Ladida", except in the US where the second single released was "Stand by You". "Stand by You" was later recorded by the UK pop group S Club 7 for their album 7.

The album won best pop album at the 1999 Danish Music Awards. Remee and Holger Lagerfeldt were also nominated for producer of the year for the album, and "Stand by You" was nominated for best radio hit.

Track listing
 "S.O.A.P. Intro"
 "Stand by You"
 "This Is How We Party"
 "Romeo & Juliet"
 "Not Like Other Girls"
 "Who Can I Talk To"
 "Simon Says"
 "Ladidi Ladida"
 "Wishing"
 "Deep in My Heart"
 "Dowutchalike"
 "Live Forever"
 "Ladidi Ladida - Part II (TNT Meets Remee)"

Charts

Certifications

References

External links
Not Like Other Girls at discogs.com

S.O.A.P. (band) albums
1998 debut albums